Mary Cybulski is an American script supervisor and film director, active since the 1980s. She was a script supervisor to the successful films Eternal Sunshine of the Spotless Mind (2004),  Syriana (2005), Michael Clayton (2007), and Life of Pi (2012). She also co-directed and co-edited the 1997 film Chicago Cab with her husband John Tintori. Her son Ray Tintori is also in the film industry.

Filmography

1988 
1989 True Love  (title designer)
1990 The Grifters
1991 Little Man Tate
1991 Dogfight
1993 Mad Dog and Glory
1995 Roommates
1995 To Wong Foo, Thanks for Everything! Julie Newmar
1996 Lone Star
1996 The Crucible
1997 Chicago Cab (as director and editor)
1997 The Ice Storm
1997 The Spanish Prisoner
1997 Firehouse (TV Movie)
1998 The Gingerbread Man
1998 The Hi-Lo Country
2000 State and Main
2001 Heist
2002 Sunshine State
2002 People I Know
2002 Maid in Manhattan
2003 In the Cut
2004 Spartan
2004 Eternal Sunshine of the Spotless Mind
2004 Silver City
2004 Kinsey
2005 Bee Season
2005 Syriana
2006 Lady in the Water
2007 Michael Clayton
2007 Berlin (Documentary)
2007 The Brave One
2008 Be Kind Rewind
2008 New Amsterdam (TV Series) 
2008 Synecdoche, New York
2008 The Happening
2009 Duplicity
2009 Taking Woodstock
2010 The Last Airbender
2010 Eat Pray Love
2010 The Tempest
2011 Arthur
2012 Life of Pi

References

External links
 

American script supervisors
American women film directors
Living people
Year of birth missing (living people)
Place of birth missing (living people)